Andrew John Belsak (born 14 June 1971) is a former Australian cricketer.  Belsak was a right-handed batsman who bowled right-arm medium pace.  He was born in Launceston, Tasmania.

Belsak played a single List A match for Tasmania against Victoria in the 1994–95 Mercantile Mutual Cup. He was dismissed for 2 runs by Troy Corbett, with Victoria winning by 78 runs.

See also
 List of Tasmanian representative cricketers

References

External links
Andrew Belsak at ESPNcricinfo
Andrew Belsak at CricketArchive

1971 births
Living people
Cricketers from Launceston, Tasmania
Australian cricketers
Tasmania cricketers